24 Shades of Blue is a law enforcement podcast that first aired in November 2020. It is funded by the Toronto Police Service and produced by Obie & Ax Inc.

The Police funding of the podcast was criticised by Toronto politicians in 2023.

Production 
24 Shades of Blue It is funded by the Toronto Police Service and produced by Obie & Ax Inc. Production costs exceeded $300,000. Toronto Police Service have editorial control over the podcast's content.

The podcast was launched in November 2020. As of mid February 2023, the podcast had reached 94,500 listeners.

Format 
The podcast is presented as a series of interviews and is hosted by Andy O'Brien and Axel Villamil, of the production company Obie & Ax Inc.

Espies include an interview with Black police officer Stacy Clarke.

Critical reception 
Former Toronto mayor John Sewell questioned if the city's police needed to spend their money on a podcast. Toronto city councillor Josh Matlow was critical that the production of the podcast was awarded through a non-competitive process.

References

External links 
 24 Shades of Blue Official webpage

Canadian podcasts
Interview podcasts
2020 podcast debuts
Works about law enforcement in Canada